The 1976 NAIA Division II football season was the 21st season of college football sponsored by the NAIA and the seventh season of play of the NAIA's lower division for football.

The season was played from August to November 1976 and culminated in the 1976 NAIA Division II Football National Championship, played on the campus of the University of Redlands in Redlands, California.

Westminster (PA) defeated Redlands in the championship game, 20–13, to win their second NAIA national title.

Conference standings

Postseason

See also
 1976 NAIA Division I football season
 1976 NCAA Division I football season
 1976 NCAA Division II football season
 1976 NCAA Division III football season

References

 
NAIA Football National Championship